Gerardo Christian Hernández Briseño (born July 12, 1982, in Mexico City) is a professional Mexican footballer.

References

1982 births
Living people
Mexican footballers
Ascenso MX players
Footballers from Mexico City
Association footballers not categorized by position
21st-century Mexican people